Richard Smith (born 12 December 1971) is an English guitarist specialising in the fingerstyle guitar tradition of Merle Travis, Chet Atkins, and Jerry Reed. He is the 2001 National Fingerstyle Guitar Champion.

Biography
Smith was born in Beckenham, England. He picked up the guitar when he was five years old after watching his father playing an Atkins and Travis version of "Down South Blues". He begged his father, a longtime Atkins admirer, to introduce him to the fingerpicking style. Smith soon became a child prodigy on the guitar. As a kid he could play the entire discographies of Django Reinhardt and Chet Atkins. At the age of 11 he shared the stage with his idol when Atkins invited Smith to play with him at Her Majesty's Theatre in London. He was also influenced by guitarist Big Jim Sullivan and briefly studied jazz guitar with Shane Hill at Warlingham School, Surrey.

He formed the Richard Smith Guitar Trio with his brothers Rob and Sam before marrying American cellist Julie Adams and moving to Nashville, Tennessee in 1999. He founded the Hot Club of Nashville, a jam band with a varying lineup that included John Jorgenson, Pat Bergeson, Bryan Sutton, and Stuart Duncan, combining gypsy jazz and western swing. Smith performs as a solo act and a duo with his wife. His repertoire includes country, bluegrass, blues, ragtime, folk, jazz, pop, and classical music.

A 2018 video of Smith performing Scott Joplin's "The Entertainer" went viral on YouTube, amassing over 14 million views as of February, 2023.

Gear
Smith plays a signature instrument made by luthier Kirk Sand from Laguna Beach, California. The Richard Smith Model is an acoustic-electric nylon-string guitar. He also endorses steel-string models by Stonebridge Guitars. He prefers German-built AER amplifiers for his guitars. Richard uses D'Addario strings and accessories.

Awards and honors
Smith won the National Fingerstyle Guitar Championship at the Walnut Valley Festival in Winfield, Kansas in 2001. The National Thumbpickers Hall of Fame named him Thumbpicker of the Year in 2008 and 2021 and inducted him into the Hall of Fame in 2009. He received the Golden Thumbpick Award by the Association of Fingerstyle Guitarists.

Discography
Solo:
 2002: Requests
 2006: Fingerstyle Artistry (Mel Bay DVD)
 2007: Slim Pickin 2014: Mastering Thumbpicking with Richard Smith (Homespun Music Instruction DVD)
 2017: One Man RoadshowWith The Richard Smith Guitar Trio: 1996: The Richard Smith Guitar Trio
 1997: Welcome to Smithville
 1998: Strike it Rich!
 1999: Out of BoundsWith Jim Nichols 2003: Live at Boulevard MusicWith Julie Adams 2001: Living Out a Dream
 2009: Seems Like Old TimesWith Aaron Till 2004: Out of NowhereWith Joscho Stephan: 2007: Live in Concert (Acoustic Music Records DVD, special guest appearance)With Joscho Stephan: & Rory Hoffman:'
 Transatlantic Guitar Trio

References

External links
 Official site

1971 births
Living people
English country guitarists
English jazz guitarists
English folk guitarists
English male guitarists
21st-century British guitarists
21st-century British male musicians